Ray Avery may refer to:

 Ray Avery (scientist) (born 1947), New Zealand scientist and inventor
 Ray Avery (photographer) (1920–2002), American photographer